Sergey Viktorovich Ryzhikov (born 19 September 1980) is a Russian football coach and a former goalkeeper. He is the manager of Spartak Tambov.

Club career
On 22 November 2007 it was announced Ryzhikov was moving to FC Rubin Kazan. He left Rubin after 10 seasons at the club on 15 May 2018, after losing his starting spot in the season to Soslan Dzhanayev.

On 1 August 2018, Ryzhikov signed a 2-year contract with PFC Krylia Sovetov Samara. After his contract with Krylia Sovetov expired, Ryzhikov signed a one-year contract with Tambov on 3 August 2020. On 9 March 2021, he left Tambov due to non-payment of wages.

Career statistics

Notes

International
He was called up for the national team for the first time in a match against Wales.

He made his national team debut on 29 March 2011 in a friendly against Qatar.

On 2 June 2014, he was included in the Russia's 2014 FIFA World Cup squad.

Coaching career
On 30 September 2022, Ryzhikov was appointed manager of the Russian Second League club FC Spartak Tambov.

Honors

Club
 Russian Premier League winner
 Russian Premier League 2008
 Russian Premier League 2009
 Russian Super Cup winner
 2010 Russian Super Cup

Individual
In the list of 33 best football players of the championship of Russia (3): № 2 (2008, 2009, 2010).
In September, 2008 has received a debut call in the first Russian national team

Personal life
Ryzhikov is married, and has three children, a son and two daughters. His brother Andrei Ryzhikov is also a professional footballer.

References

External links

 Player page on FC Lokomotiv Moscow site
 Player page on FC Rubin Kazan site

1980 births
Living people
People from Shebekino
FC Salyut Belgorod players
FC Saturn Ramenskoye players
FC Lokomotiv Moscow players
FC Anzhi Makhachkala players
FC Tom Tomsk players
FC Rubin Kazan players
PFC Krylia Sovetov Samara players
FC Tambov players
Russian footballers
Association football goalkeepers
Russian Premier League players
Russia international footballers
2014 FIFA World Cup players
Sportspeople from Belgorod Oblast
Russian football managers